Vincent Workman (born May 9, 1967) is a former professional American football running back who was selected by the Green Bay Packers in the fifth round of the 1989 NFL Draft. Workman played eight seasons in the NFL, from 1989 to 1996, for the Packers, the Tampa Bay Buccaneers, the Carolina Panthers and the Indianapolis Colts. Prior to his career at Ohio State University, he attended Dublin Coffman High School in Dublin, Ohio, where he still owns all but one rushing record from his tenure in 1982-1984. Workman was a three-year starter at running back and wide receiver while at Ohio State and was Team Captain in 1988. Workman then worked for the Packers as a Pro Scout and Strength Coach from 1999-2006.

Workman is the owner of the Green Bay Packers' team record for most catches by a running back in a single game with 12 in 1992 vs the Minnesota Vikings. He also owns the Carolina Panther's record for most receptions by a running back in a game vs the LA Rams in 1995.

References

1967 births
Living people
American football running backs
Carolina Panthers players
Indianapolis Colts players
Green Bay Packers players
Ohio State Buckeyes football players
Tampa Bay Buccaneers players
Players of American football from Buffalo, New York
People from Dublin, Ohio
Players of American football from Ohio